The House of Potier was a noble house in Ancien Régime France. Members of the Potier family were Nobles of the Robe who gained their prominence through serving the King of France.

List of Members of the House of Potier

Simon Potier, seigneur de Groslay et de Blanc-Mesnil (fl 1395/1420)
Nicolas Potier, seigneur de Blancmesnil, Groslay, La Grange, Courberon et Courbevoie (d. 1501)
Nicolas Potier, seigneur de Blancmesnil et de Groslay
Jacques Potier, seigneur de Blancmesnil et Plessis-Gassot (d. 1555)
Nicolas Potier, seigneur de l’arrière-fief du Petit-Coudray à Blanc-Mesnil (c1541-1645)
René Potier (c1576-1616), Bishop of Beauvais
Bernard Potier, seigneur de Silly (ca. 1578-1610)
Nicolas Potier, seigneur d’Ocquerre (d. 1628)
René Potier, seigneur de Blancmesnil (d. 1680)
Marie-Renée Potier, dame de Blanc-Mesnil et du Bourget (1678-1700)
Augustin Potier, seigneur d’Ocquerre (d. 1704)
Jeanne Potier (d. 1681) - married Michel de Marillac, seigneur d’Ollainville
Madeleine Potier (c1623-1705) - married Guillaume de Lamoignon, marquis de Basville
André Potier, seigneur de Novion (d. 1645)
Nicolas Potier, seigneur de Novion (c1618-1694)
André Potier, marquis de Novion (d. 1677)
André Potier de Novion, marquis de Grignon (1659-1731)
Nicolas Potier de Novion, marquis de Grignon (1685-1720)
André Potier de Novion, marquis de Novion et de Grignon (1711-1769)
Anne Marie Gabrielle Potier de Novion (b. 1747) - married Alexandre Guillaume de Galard de Béarn, comte de Brassac
Philippa-Léontine Potier de Novion (b. 1748) - married Aymard-Charles Marie de Nicolaÿ, marquis de Courances-Le-Béni,
Antoinette Potier de Novion (c1687-1726) - married Charles-Adolphedes Lions, comte d’Epaux
Louis-Nicolas Anne Jules Potier de Novion, marquis de Novion (c1666-1707)
Nicolas Potier de Novion, comte de Montauglan (d. 1706
Antoinette Potier de Novion (1685-1754) - married Gaspard de Clermont-Tonnerre, marquis de Vauvillers
Marie Potier de Novion (d. 1747) - married Jean-Baptiste Louis Berrier, seigneur de La Ferrière
Jacques Potier de Novion (c1647-1709), Bishop of Sisteron and then Bishop of Évreux
Catherine-Madeleine Potier de Novion (c.1646-1709) - married Antoine de Ribeyre, seigneur d’Homme
Marthe-Agnès Potier de Novion (d. 1686) - married Arnaud de Labriffe, marquis de Ferrières
Augustin Potier (d. 1650), Bishop of Beauvais
Renée Potier - married Oudart Hennequin, seigneur de Boinville
Madeleine Potier (c1587-1671) - married Théodore Choart, seigneur de Buzenval
Louis Potier, Count of Tresmes (d. 1630)
René Potier, Duke of Tresmes (c1579-1670)
Louis Potier, marquis de Gresves (c1612-1645)
François Potier, marquis de Gesvres (c1612-1646)
Léon Potier, Duke of Gesvres (c1620-1704)
François-Bernard Potier, Duke of Gesvres (1655-1739)
François-Joachim Bernard Potier, Duke of Gesvres (1692-1757)
Louis-Léon Marie Potier, Duke of Gesvres (1695-1774)
Louis-Joachim Paris Potier, Duke of Gesvres (1733-1794)
Etienne-René Potier de Gesvres (1697-1774) - Abbot of Orcamp
Marie-Françoise Potier de Gesvres (1697-1715) - married Louis-Marie Victor de Béthune, comte de Béthune
Léon Potier de Gesvres (1656-1744) - Abbot of St-Géraud d'Aurillac
Charlotte-Julie Potier de Gesvres (1669-1752) - married Charles-Amédée de Broglie, marquis de Revel
Louise-Henriette Potier (d. 1680) - married (1) Emmanuel de Faudoas-Averton, comte de Belin; (2) Jacques de Saulx-Tavannes, comte de Tavannes et Buzançais
Marguerite Potier (d. 1669) - married Henri de Saulx-Tavannes, marquis de Mirebel
Louise Potier (d. 1681) - Abbess of La Barre
Anne-Marie Madeleine Potier, marquise de Blérancourt (1623-1705)
Madeleine Potier (d. 1603) - married Bernard Prévost, seigneur de Morsan
Françoise Potier (d. 1618) - Abbess of Longchamp
Marie Potier (d. 1630) - married Claude Le Roux, seigneur de Bourgtheroulde
Françoise Potier - Abbess of Trois-Fontaines
Marthe Potier - married Nicolas Moreau, seigneur d’Auteuil et de Thoiry
Marie Potier (d. 1535) - married Louis de Besançon, seigneur d’Orvilliers

References

History of the Potier family

Potier